Zane Winslade (born 17 April 1983) is a New Zealand rugby union footballer. A back row, was formerly playing for București Oaks in the European Challenge Cup.

Zane Winslade played for the Tasman Makos in the Air New Zealand Cup from 2006 till 2009.

He was an openside flanker that ran and tackled hard. He played for Bucuresti Oaks, London Scottish and SLB Benfica rugby in Lisbon, Portugal. He has now returned to New Zealand and works as a Mental Skills Coach

External links
 
 

1983 births
Living people
New Zealand rugby union players
Rugby union flankers